Rebula may refer to:

 Alenka Rebula (born 1954), Slovene poet and psychotherapist
 Alojz Rebula (1924–2018), Slovene writer
 Jovan Rebula (born 1997), South African professional golfer
 Oto Rebula (1921–2001), Serbian athlete
 Ribolla Gialla, a white Italian wine grape

Slovene-language surnames